Arthur Silver Morton  (1870–1945) was a Canadian historian, archivist, and academic.

Born in Iere Village, Trinidad, on 16 May 1870, Morton studied at the University of Edinburgh before moving to Canada to become a Presbyterian minister. He was chief librarian and head of the history department at the University of Saskatchewan. He also served as the first provincial archivist of Saskatchewan from 1938 until 1945.

His publications included The History of Prairie Settlement and History of the Canadian West to 1870–71.
He was named a Person of National Historic Significance in 1952 he was also a Fellow of the Royal Society of Canada and a recipient of the Tyrrell Medal.

Morton died on 26 January 1945.

References

1870 births
1945 deaths
20th-century Canadian historians
20th-century Presbyterian ministers
Alumni of the University of Edinburgh
Canadian archivists
Canadian historians of religion
Canadian medievalists
Canadian Presbyterian ministers
Fellows of the Royal Society of Canada
Historians of Canada
Historians of Christianity
Academic staff of the University of Saskatchewan